Kristin Griffith (born September 7, 1953) is an American actress.

Filmography 
Interiors (1978, by Woody Allen) – Flyn
The Europeans (1979, by James Ivory) – Lizzie Acton
Flesh & Blood (1979 TV movie) – Michelle
CHiPs – episode "Bomb Run" (1981) – Terri
In the Line of Duty: Manhunt in the Dakotas (1991 TV movie)
Gregory K.: A Place to Be (1993 TV movie) – Elizabeth Russ
King of the Hill (1993, Steven Soderbergh) – Mrs. McShane
Law & Order – episode "Seed" (1995) – Clara Brock
Rose Hill (1997 TV movie) – Annie
The Long Way Home (1998 TV movie) – Bonnie Gerrin
Tis the Season (1998 short) – Aunt Katie
Wonderland – episode "20/20 Hindsight" (2000) – Carolina Rickle
Calling Bobcat (2000) – Mrs. Marshall
Law & Order: Special Victims Unit – episode "Runaway" (2001) – Mrs. Foster
Revolution#9 (2001) – Gale
Law & Order – episode "All My Children" (2001) – Brenda Lucas
Ed – episode "Wheel of Justice" (2002) – Barbara Jerricho
Law & Order: Criminal Intent – episode "Want" (2004) – Amanda Norman
Third Watch – episode "How Do You Spell Belief?" (2005) – Stevie's Mother
New Amsterdam – episode "Pilot" (2008) – Mrs. Carlton
I Smile Back (2015) – Nurse Pauline
Ben Is Back (2018) – Mrs. Crane
Succession episodes "Pre Nupital" and "Nobody Is Ever Missing" (2018) – Mrs Wambsgans
The Deuce (2019) – Phyllis Lang
Big Dogs (2020) – Renny's Mom
The Devil All the Time (2020) – Emma Russell
Archive 81 (2022) – Cassandra Wall

External links 
 

Internet Theatre Database entry

1953 births
Living people
Actresses from Texas
American film actresses
American television actresses
People from Odessa, Texas
21st-century American women